Judith Cabaud (born 8 July 1941, New York City) is an American-born French writer and musicologist. She was born into a Jewish family of Polish and Russian heritage.

After studying science at New York University, she went to Paris and obtained her degree in French civilization in 1960 at the Sorbonne, and converted to Catholicism.

A musicologist and a professor of English, she is the author of several books on relations between Judaism and Christianity, the role of Pius XII during World War II, and the Grand Rabbi of Rome, Eugenio Zolli. She has also been a music critic at the Bayreuth Festival in Germany since 1994.

Bibliography
 Where Time Becomes Space, Franciscan Herald Press, 1979
 Sur les balcons du ciel, Dominique Martin Morin, 1985 (preface of Raymond Leopold Bruckberger). Second edition in 1999
 Mathilde Wesendonck, ou, Le rêve d'Isolde, Actes Sud, 1990
 La Blessure de Jonathan P., L'Age d'Homme, 1998
 Eugenio Zolli : Prophète d'un monde nouveau, François-Xavier de Guibert, 2002 (translated into six languages)
 La Tradition hébraïque dans l'Eucharistie : Eugenio Zolli et la liturgie du sacrifice, François-Xavier de Guibert, 2006
 La Poule rebelle et autres contes du Gajun, François-Xavier de Guibert, 2007
 Postface de Histoire des Juifs, d'Abraham à nos jours par Bernard Antony, Godefroy de Bouillon, 2007
 Préface de Béni soit celui qui vient au nom du Seigneur : Du judaïsme hassidique au catholicisme, histoire d'une conversion par Elisabeth Smadja, François-Xavier de Guibert, 2007

Translations
 Eugenio Zolli, Avant l'aube : Autobiographie spirituelle, François-Xavier de Guibert, 2002
 Roy H. Schoeman, Le Salut vient des Juifs : Le rôle du Judaïsme dans l'histoire du salut depuis Abraham jusqu'au Second, Francois-Xavier De Guibert, 2006
 Roy H. Schoeman, Le miel du rocher. Seize témoignages d'accomplissement de la foi d'Israël dans le Christ, Francois-Xavier De Guibert, 2008

References
Catholic Culture article about Cabaud's book about Zolli

1941 births
American biographers
American women biographers
American people of Polish-Jewish descent
American people of Russian-Jewish descent
American writers in French
New York University alumni
University of Paris alumni
Converts to Roman Catholicism from Judaism
French people of Polish-Jewish descent
French people of Russian-Jewish descent
French Roman Catholics
French non-fiction writers
Living people
American emigrants to France